G. nobilis may refer to:
 Gallinago nobilis, the noble snipe, a small stocky wader species found in the Andes of Colombia, Ecuador, Peru and Venezuela
 Gambusia nobilis, the Pecos gambusia, a fish species endemic to the United States
 Gnorimus nobilis, the noble chafer, a green beetle species
 Gonystylus nobilis, a plant species endemic to Malaysia

See also
 Nobilis (disambiguation)